Norma Bates may refer to:

 Norma Bates (Passions),  a fictional character in the soap opera Passions
 Norma Bates (Psycho), a fictional character in the novel and film series Psycho
 Norma Bates a fictional character in No Room at the Inn